Rapti-Sonari Rural Municipality (Nepali :राप्तिसोनारी गाउँपालिका) is a Gaunpalika in Banke District in Lumbini Province of Nepal. On 12 March 2017, the government of Nepal implemented a new local administrative structure. With the implementation of the new structure, VDCs have been replaced with municipal and Village Councils. Rapti-Sonari is one of these 753 local units.

Demographics
At the time of the 2011 Nepal census, Rapti-Sonari Rural Municipality had a population of 60,925. Of these, 48.3% spoke Tharu, 41.1% Nepali, 4.7% Awadhi, 4.2% Urdu, 1.1% Magar, 0.2% Maithili, 0.1% Hindi, 0.1% Doteli and 0.2% other languages as their first language.

In terms of ethnicity/caste, 49.2% were Tharu, 21.3% Chhetri, 6.8% Magar, 4.4% Kami, 4.4% Musalman, 1.9% Kumal, 1.7% Damai/Dholi, 1.7% Hill Brahmin, 1.6% Yadav and 7.0% others.

In terms of religion, 94.4% were Hindu, 4.3% Muslim, 0.9% Christian and 0.4% Buddhist.

References 

Populated places in Banke District
Rural municipalities of Nepal established in 2017